Stade des Arbères is a football stadium in Meyrin, Switzerland. It is the home ground for FC Meyrin and has a capacity of 2,018.

References 
http://sport-campina.blogspot.com/2011/06/meyrin-elvetia-stade-des-ar

Football venues in Switzerland
Meyrin
Buildings and structures in the canton of Geneva